Balázs Orbán (born 13 February 1986) is a Hungarian lawyer, political scientist, university lecturer, who has served as political director of the Prime Minister under Viktor Orbán since 2021. From 2018 to 2022, Orbán was deputy minister, and parliamentary and strategic state secretary. Since 2020, he has been the chairman of the Mathias Corvinus Collegium's board of trustees.

Early life 
Orbán was born in Budapest. Between 1998 and 2004 he studied at the Apáczai Csere János Preparatory Grammar School and College of the Eötvös Loránd University in Budapest. Between 2004 and 2009 he was a law student at the Eötvös Loránd University Faculty of Law, where he obtained Juris Doctor with summa cum laude. Between 2007 and 2011 he obtained a BA degree in political science at the same institution. From 2009 until 2012 he was a PhD student at the Doctoral School of the Eötvös Loránd University Faculty of Law. Between 2013 and 2014 he was a student at the Pázmány Péter Catholic University Faculty of Law and Political Science, where he obtained an LL.M. degree in legal regulation in public administration.

In 2009 he took a Public Registrar examination, in 2010 he passed a competitive administrative examination at the Central Hungarian Regional Public Administration Office, in 2011 he took an administrative examination at the Regional Public Administration Office of Central Hungary, and in 2014 he took a legal examination at the Ministry of Public Administration and Justice.

He speaks English at an advanced level and German at an intermediate level.

Career 
After graduating, between 2009 and 2012, he first dealt with official matters in the Ministry of Justice as a legal specialist, then with regulatory legislative tasks, and with the preparation of legislation.

Teaching career 
Orbán has taught at various universities and colleges since graduating from university, and from 2016 he was an assistant professor at the National University of Public Service. He has been teaching at the Mathias Corvinus Collegium since 2015, and from 2020 has been the chairman of its board of trustees. The talent development workshop provides international-quality training and scholarship programs for thousands of the most talented young Hungarians living throughout the Carpathian Basin, from primary school through to university education.

Research career 
Leaving his administrative career behind in 2012, Orbán began working at the Századvég Foundation, a conservative think tank, where until 2013 he was a regulatory expert, and from 2013 became director of research at the foundation, where he directed and coordinated public law and public policy research until 2018. As research director, he was a frequent expert analyst on public service programs in the national media, and wrote regularly for various daily and weekly newspapers. Between 2016 and 2018, he was also a board member at the Századvég Foundation.

In 2015 the Századvég Foundation and the Mathias Corvinus Collegium co-founded the Migration Research Institute, of which Orbán became the first director. He held this position until his appointment as state secretary in 2018. The institute considers migration to be one of the most important issues of the 21st century, and in order to gain a more thorough understanding of this topic, it provides research, education, publication and speaking opportunities for experts in various aspects (humanitarian, security, cultural, economic) of migration. During its existence, the institute has organized several professional workshops and international conferences, and its researchers regularly carry out fieldwork in crisis regions and publish in domestic and foreign journals.

Political career 
From 22 May 2018, Orbán has been deputy minister and parliamentary and strategic state secretary at the Office of the Prime Minister. In addition to parliamentary representation, his responsibilities include the development of government strategy, and incorporating the most important scientific findings of various domestic and foreign research institutes into the processes of government strategy and legislation.

Since 2018 Orbán has been the Chairman of the Advisory Board of the National University of Public Service, and thus is also responsible for the development and modernization of the university. 

From 20 August 2021, Orbán serves as a political director under Viktor Orbán, advising the Prime Minister on his activities and on the preparation of his decisions on political, social, economic and public policy and other issues, and coordinating the work of the Prime Minister's advisers. Following his appointment on 25 may 2022, he continued his tenure as a political director in the Fifth Orbán Government helping the decision making of the Prime Minister and the Cabinet too, on an even wider range of issues, including on general political questions, foreign, economic, social and public policy.

Personal life 
Orbán is married, and has two children.

Works 
Orbán's articles and analyses are frequently published in a range of online and printed newspapers and journals, and he publishes in the field of constitutional law. From 2018 to 2020, he was the columnist responsible for a legal affairs column entitled ‘Precedent’ in the Hungarian newspaper Mandiner.

Books

References 

 Information about Balázs Orbán on the website of the Government of Hungary
 Balázs Orbán's CV on the website of the National University of Public Service
 
 
 
 
 
 

1986 births
Living people
Eötvös Loránd University alumni
Pázmány Péter Catholic University alumni
21st-century Hungarian lawyers
Hungarian political scientists
People from Budapest
Political office-holders in Hungary
Hungarian academics
Hungarian columnists
Members of the National Assembly of Hungary (2022–2026)